Samuel Stringham Powell (February 16, 1815 – February 6, 1879) was an American businessman, politician, and Mayor of Brooklyn.

Life 
Powell was born on February 16, 1815, in New York City, New York, on Water Street, the son of Jonah Powell and Abigail Stillwell.

When Powell was 13, family reverses led him to begin working, initially with a New York store. In 1828, he moved to Brooklyn and began working for Sylvanus B. Stillwell, the city's leading clothier. After four years, he began working on his own and became a successful businessman. He was a director of the Central Bank, the Citizens Gas Light Co., and the Nassau and Lafayette Insurance Companies.

In 1845, Powell was elected alderman of Second Ward as a Democrat. He was later elected Mayor of Brooklyn, serving in the office from 1857 to 1861. He was later re-elected as Mayor and served from 1872 to 1873. In 1874, he was elected Comptroller. In 1877, he was appointed Park Commissioner. He was then elected County Treasurer, and his term for the office began in 1878, but his declining health meant he did little in that position.

In 1837, Powell married Huldah A. Frazer. They had two children, Thomas Frazer and William Stilwell.

Powell died at home from cancer on February 6, 1879. He was buried in his family plot in Green-Wood Cemetery.

References

External links 

 The Political Graveyard
 Samuel S. Powell at Find a Grave

1815 births
1879 deaths
Mayors of Brooklyn
19th-century American businesspeople
Businesspeople from Brooklyn
New York (state) Democrats
19th-century American politicians
New York (state) city council members
Deaths from cancer in New York (state)
Burials at Green-Wood Cemetery